The Mayor of Wairoa officiates over the Wairoa District of New Zealand's North Island.

Craig Little is the current mayor of Wairoa. He has held the position since 2013.

List of mayors

References

Wairoa
Wairoa
Wairoa District
Wairoa
People from Wairoa